Wannabe Ryan is a South Korean show. Produced by Kakao M, it aired on KakaoTV from September 1 to November 20, 2020 every Tuesday and Friday at 17:00 (KST).

Format 
Wannabe Ryan is a survival entertainment in which "Senior Ryan" is a role model, and dirt spoon mascots from all over the country enter the world's first mascot art general school "Mayejong" and challenge themselves to become senior graduates.

Cast

Staff 
 Kim Hee-chul : Head Student
 Shim Hyung-tak : Homeroom
 Choi Yoo-jung : Special student (episodes 1 - 5)
 Lee Na-eun : Special student (episodes 6 - 13)
 (G)I-dle (Miyeon, Yuqi) : Special students (episodes 14 - 16)

Student 
 Dream
 Bow 
 Bum, Bear
 Bucheon Handbrow
 Pamang
 Chamo 
 Winnie
 Talking grandfather
 Corn parka 
 Healey
 Victo

Special appearance 
 Hong Jameon : Special Judge
 Holman : Special appearance (episodes 6 - 7)
 Lotty & Lori : Special Judge (episode 7)
 Krunk (YG Entertainment's Celeb bear)
 Shin Jeong-in : Special Judge
 Kim Bo-Tong : Special Judge

OST

References 

KakaoTV original programming
2020 South Korean television series debuts
2020 South Korean television series endings
Korean-language television shows